Taiwo Odukoya is a Nigerian Pentecostal pastor.  He is the senior pastor of The Fountain of Life Church, Ilupeju, Lagos, with a membership strength of over 8,000 people.

Early life 

Taiwo Odukoya was born on 15 June 1956 in the city of Kaduna, Colonial Nigeria, where he was also raised. He had his primary and secondary education at Baptist Primary School, Kigo Road, Kaduna and St. Paul's College (now known as Kufena College, Wusasa) Zaria respectively, before proceeding to the University of Ibadan in 1976 where he obtained a degree in petroleum engineering in 1981. As a petroleum engineer, he started work at the Nigerian National Petroleum Corporation (NNPC) in April 1982 after the compulsory one-year National Youth Service Corp (NYSC) scheme, and served there until his voluntary retirement in January 1994 after his call to the ministry.

Family 

In 1980, Odukoya met Bimbo Williams at the University of Ibadan and the two struck a relationship that led to their marriage in 1984. The marriage produced three children. On 10 December 2005, Bimbo Odukoya, along with 102 other people, died on the crashed Sosoliso Airlines Flight 1145. Bimbo Odukoya's messages had been well and widely received by many. On 5 January 2010, five years later, Taiwo Odukoya got married again to Rosemary Simangele Zulu from South Africa. The marriage produced two boys.

In November 2021, Odukoya lost his second wife to cancer. The pastor announced the death of his wife on 9 November, saying that the South African "battled cancer for the better part of two years."

The Fountain of Life Church 

Taiwo and Bimbo Odukoya co-founded The Fountain of Life Church in 1992 with a stated vision "to teach men and women the art of building successful relationships and the principles of leadership so they can be all they are created to be. " The Church has several missions in South Africa, the United Kingdom, United States of America, Switzerland, Kenya, Central Africa Republic, Republic of Benin, Côte d'Ivoire, Republic of Benin and Togo.

Outreaches 

Odukoya proclaims a firm belief in the role of the church in the community and expresses it through several outreach projects including a hospital, an orphanage, a school for destitute children, a farm, a water project which provides boreholes at strategic locations for people who have no access to clean and portable water and a skill acquisition and entrepreneurial institute for the less privileged.
On April 19, 1997, Taiwo Odukoya set up Discovery for Men and Discovery for Women, non-denominational outreaches to men and women designed to help them maximize their potential. These outreaches reach out to hundreds of thousands of men and women annually through quarterly rallies, mentorship programs and a vocational center to equip them with technical and practical life skills.

Controversy 
In 2014, nine years after the death of his first wife, Odukoya readdressed the matter of the plane crash that made him a widower. He claimed that pastors are well advised to use private jets: such aircraft better facilitate pastoral ministry and are a safer means of travel than commercial flights.

References 

Living people
1956 births
People from Kaduna
Nigerian Pentecostal pastors
Nigerian Christian clergy
Yoruba Christian clergy
University of Ibadan alumni